John Henry Hoeppel (February 10, 1881 – September 21, 1976) was a U.S. Representative from California. He served two terms, from 1933 through 1937, but was expelled from Congress for trying to profit from his appointment of a student to a military service academy.

Early life
Born near Tell City, Indiana, Hoeppel attended grammar school in Evansville, Indiana but did not attend high school. He enlisted in the United States Army on July 27, 1898, and served successively as private, corporal, and sergeant until 1921, with service in France during the First World War.

Hoeppel moved to Arcadia, California in 1919. He was the postmaster of Arcadia from 1923 to 1931. In 1928, he became editor of National Defense magazine.

Political career
Hoeppel was elected as a Democrat to the Seventy-third and to the Seventy-fourth Congresses (March 4, 1933 – January 3, 1937). He served as chairman of the Committee on War Claims (Seventy-fourth Congress). In 1933 he was instrumental in persuading the U.S. Army to donate 183 acres of land from the Ross Field Army Balloon School to Los Angeles County to be developed as a park.

He was accused in 1934 of conspiracy to sell an appointment to the West Point Military Academy for $1,000.  He was found guilty by the U.S. Senate and removed from office. He was then found guilty in US Courts and sentenced to four to twelve months in prison.

His son Charles J. Hoeppel, who was seeking appointment to the U.S. Naval Academy as part of the deal, was also convicted. Their appeal in 1936 was unsuccessful.

Hoeppel was an unsuccessful candidate for renomination in 1936 to the Seventy-fifth Congress, afterwards resuming his editorial career. He was an unsuccessful Prohibition candidate for election in 1946 to the Eightieth Congress, losing to future U.S. President Richard Nixon.

Death
Hoeppel died in Arcadia on September 21, 1976, and is buried in Resurrection Cemetery, San Gabriel, California.

See also
List of American federal politicians convicted of crimes
List of federal political scandals in the United States
List of members of the American Legion

References

External links

 

1881 births
1976 deaths
20th-century American politicians
Activists from California
American politicians convicted of federal public corruption crimes
California politicians convicted of crimes
California Prohibitionists
Democratic Party members of the United States House of Representatives from California
Expelled members of the United States House of Representatives
People from Arcadia, California
People from Tell City, Indiana
Politicians from Evansville, Indiana
United States Army soldiers